The  is a museum that opened in Shibuya, Tokyo, Japan, in January 1980. It presents rotating exhibitions of Ukiyo-e from Ōta Seizo V's collection of over 12,000 pieces.

See also
 Woodblock printing in Japan

References

External links

  Ōta Memorial Museum of Art
  Ōta Memorial Museum of Art

Ukiyo-e Museum
Art museums and galleries in Tokyo
Buildings and structures in Shibuya
Art museums established in 1980
1980 establishments in Japan
Harajuku